Trailin' West (UK title: On Secret Service) is a 1936 American Western film directed by Noel M. Smith and written by Anthony Coldeway and starring Dick Foran, Paula Stone, and Wild Bill Elliott.

Plot
In 1864, President Abraham Lincoln sends an undercover agent, Lt. Red Colton, to fictional Kent City to apprehend Curly Thorne and his outlaws who are disrupting Union gold shipments.  Nearing the town, Red stops the robbery of a stage line, and meets passenger Lucy Blake. Red checks in to the local hotel under the name "John Madison," but his credentials are stolen. Jefferson Duane, in cahoots with Thorne, uses Red's credentials to gain the trust of the Union's Colonel Douglas to gain information about the gold shipments. 

Red accepts a job as a card dealer at Thorne's bar where Lucy works as a dance hall girl. Red and Lucy overhear a plot between Duane and Thorne to secure assistance from Black Eagle and his Indian tribe in exchange for running guns to the Indians. Lucy erroneously believes Red as "John Madison" is involved in this plot and reports it to Colonel Douglas.  Red is arrested and is unable to convince Colonel Douglas of his true identity after Duane lies about his own identity. It is revealed that Lucy, also, is working undercover for the Union.

Red escapes custody and convinces Lucy, in Duane's presence, that he, not Duane, is the true Union agent. A gunfight ensues as Duane and his thugs escape during which Lucy receives a flesh wound. Red reports to Colonel Douglas and also convinces him of his true identity. Red leads Union troops to intervene just as the gold shipment is under attack by the Indians and Thorne's gang. The shipment is saved, and Red subdues both Thorne and Duane during their attempted escape. President Lincoln promotes Red to major, and it is revealed Red and Lucy are now married.

Cast
 Dick Foran as Lt. Red Colton
 Paula Stone as Lucy Blake
 Wild Bill Elliott as Jefferson Duane
 Addison Richards as Curly Thorne
 Robert Barrat as Abraham Lincoln
 Joseph Crehan as Colonel Douglas
 Fred Lawerence as Lt. Dale
 Eddie Shubert as Happy Simpson
 Henry Otto as Hawk
 Stuart Holmes as Elwin H. Stanton
 Milton Kibbee as Steve
 Jim Thorpe as Black Eagle

References

External links
 
 
 
 

1936 films
1936 Western (genre) films
American black-and-white films
American Civil War spy films
American Western (genre) films
Fictional depictions of Abraham Lincoln in film
1930s English-language films
Films directed by Noel M. Smith
1930s American films